Erica Pedretti (25 February 1930 – 14 July 2022) was a Swiss author and artist.

Born in northern Moravia, Pedretti went to Switzerland in 1945. She studied art and enjoyed a career as a writer, painter, and sculptor. For a few years she lived in the United States, but in 1952 she returned to Switzerland, where she married the Swiss painter Gian Pedretti. Pedretti has published texts since 1970, and since 1976 she has worked as an artist, especially as a sculptor.

In 1984, Pedretti received the Ingeborg Bachmann Prize for her text The modell and his painter and in 1996 the Marie Luise Kaschnitz Prize for her novel Engste Heimat.

References

Further reading
 Valentina Glajar: Narrating History and Subjectivity: „Vergangenheitsbewältigung“ in Erica Pedretti's „Engste Heimat“ (1995). In: Glajar, The German Legacy in East Central Europe. As Recorded in Recent German Language Literature, pp. 72–114. Camden House, Rochester NY 2004
 Dolores Denaro (ed.): Erica Pedretti. Flügelschlag./The Beat of Wings. Mit Werkverzeichnis/ With catalogue raisonné. Verlag für Moderne Kunst, Wien 2017, .(Publication in German and English)

External links
 
 
 Portrait & Bibliography
 Entretien avec Erica Pedretti par Patricia Zurcher (French/German)
 
 

1930 births
2022 deaths
People from Šternberk
Swiss writers in German
Swiss people of Moravian-German descent
Ingeborg Bachmann Prize winners
Moravian-German people